Olivia Gomez (Bengali: অলিভিয়া গোমেজ) (born 16 February 1953) is a Bangladeshi film actress. Gomez became known in the 1970s from the Dhallywood film "The Rain" (1976). She has had parts in 53 films.

Filmography 

 Chanda Hariye Gelo (ছন্দ হারিয়ে গেল ) (1972)

 Jibon Sangeet (জীবন সঙ্গীত)
 Dur Theke Kache (দূর থেকে কাছে)
 Takar Khela (টাকার খেলা) (1974)
 Masud Rana (মাসুদ রানা) (1974)
 Sheyana (সেয়ানা) (1976)
 The Rain (দি রেইন ) (1976)
 বাহাদুর (১৯৭৬)
 বহ্নিশিখা  (১৯৭৬) [Indian Bangla Movie]
 তীর ভাঙ্গা ঢেউ (১৯৭৬)
 শাপমুক্তি (১৯৭৬)
 আদালত (১৯৭৭)
 যাদুর বাঁশী (১৯৭৭)
 আগুনের আলো
 পাগলা রাজা
 শীষ নাগ
 চন্দ্রলেখা
 লুটেরা
 কুয়াশা (১৯৭৭)
 শ্রীমতী ৪২০ (১৯৭৮)
 একালের নায়ক (১৯৭৮)

 বেদ্বীন (১৯৮০)
 ডার্লিং (১৯৮২)
 টক্কর (১৯৮৩)
 হিম্মতওয়ালী (১৯৮৪)
 লাল মেমসাহেব (১৯৮৪)
 কালা খুন
 আগুন পানি
 রাস্তার রাজা
 শাহজাদী গুলবাহার
 বন্ধু
 তকদিরের খেলা
 বুলবুল এ বাগদাদ
 লাখে একটা
 হাতকড়া (১৯৯৪)
 দুশমনি (১৯৯৫)

References

External links 
 

Living people
1953 births
Bangladeshi film actresses
Bengali actresses

Bangladeshi Christians